Günter Schneider (born 23 September 1963) is a Swiss rower. He competed in the men's coxed four event at the 1988 Summer Olympics.

References

1963 births
Living people
Swiss male rowers
Olympic rowers of Switzerland
Rowers at the 1988 Summer Olympics
Place of birth missing (living people)